Cable News Network Indonesia (known as CNN Indonesia and abbreviated as CNN ID) is a 24-hour Indonesian free-to-air television news channel owned by Trans Media in collaboration with Warner Bros. Discovery under CNN license. Broadcasting from Trans Media studios in South Jakarta, the local franchise presents national and international content, focusing on general news, business, sports and technology.

Programs are aired 24 hours daily via digital terrestrial TV networks, pay TV providers Transvision and IndiHome nationwide; and live streaming services for overseas viewers.

History 
Businessman Chairul Tanjung announced the birth of a strategic partnership between the then CNN brand owner Turner Broadcasting System unit of Time Warner (both Turner and Warner are part of what is now Warner Bros. Discovery) and Trans Media to launch a CNN-branded channel in Indonesia. CNN Indonesia began as an online portal, on 24 October 2014 with Yusuf Arifin as editor in chief. It made its soft launching as a news channel in conjunction with the 70th anniversary of the country's Proclamation of Independence on 17 August 2015; official launch of the local franchise was held in conjunction with Trans Media's 14th anniversary on 15 December 2015.

Programmes 
As of 2023, the majority of CNN Indonesia's programming is locally produced. Some of the channel's news programmes are simulcast either through Trans Media's free-to-air networks Trans TV and Trans7, most notably Redaksi which previously aired on Trans7 themselves and now it was moved and productions of the program which was redirected to CNN Indonesia.

Presenters

Current 
 Alfian Rahardjo (ex-sportscaster Trans TV and news anchor Trans7)
 Ayu Rahmawati (ex-news anchor TVR Parlemen)
 Benny Dermawan (ex-news anchor Trans7)
 Bram Herlambang (ex-news anchor Trans7)
 Daniar Achri (ex-news anchor RTV and Kompas TV)
 Dea Kartika (ex-journalist detik.com)
 Desi Anwar (ex-news anchor RCTI dan MetroTV)
 Elvira Khairunnisa (ex-news anchor tvOne)
 Eva Julianti Yunizar (ex-news anchor SCTV and MetroTV)
 Farhannisa Nasution (ex-news anchor SCTV)
 Ferdi Ilyas (ex-journalist Trans7)
 Frida Lidwina (ex-news anchor MetroTV and TVRI)
 Heranof Al Basyir (ex-news anchor MetroTV)
 Iqbal Kurniadi (ex-news anchor Trans TV)
 Lianita Ruchyat (ex-news anchor Trans7)
 Maggie Calista (ex-news anchor MetroTV)
 Mayfree Syari (ex-news anchor NET.)
 Miladia Rahma (ex-news anchor Trans7)
 Prasidya Puspa
 Putri Ayuningtyas (ex-news anchor MetroTV)
 Reza Helmi (ex-news anchor Trans7) 
 Rizky Harisnanda (ex-news anchor Jawa Pos TV)
 Rivana Pratiwi
 Sarah Ariantie (ex-news anchor Kompas TV)
 Syaza Wisastro (ex-news anchor MetroTV)
 Taufik Imansyah (ex-news anchor Trans7)
 Tifanny Raytama (ex-news anchor Trans TV)
 Yudi Yudhawan (ex-news anchor Trans TV and SUN TV)

Former 
 Cheryl Marella
 Deddy Zebua
 Olivia Marzuki (moved to CNA)
 Runny Djohar
 Alexandra Asmasoebrata
 Joy Citradewi (now on BTV)
 Indra Maulana (returned to MetroTV also moved to Medcom.id)
 Andrio Reza (moved to RCTI Sports)
 Hera F. Haryn
 Pangeran Punce
 Ryan Hasri
 Bunga Harum Dani (now on TVRI)
 Alfito Deannova Gintings (still work on Trans Media but on detik.com)
 Budi Adiputro (returned to Trans Media for special programmes)
 Prabu Revolusi (now on MNC News and BuddyKu also as a host of Konspirasi Prabu)
 Annisa Pagih
 Azizah Hanum (moved to SCTV also as a host of Point of View program)
 Ratu Nabilla (returned to MNC Media but on RCTI, iNews, MNC News and BuddyKu)
 Fanni Imaniar (moved to iNews and MNC News)
 Amelia Yachya (moved to tvOne)
 Roland Lagonda
 Aldi Hawari (moved to GTV, iNews, MNC News and BuddyKu)
 Anita Mae (now on TVRI Sport)
 Reinhard Sirait (moved to iNews and MNC News)
 Armand Helmy (moved to Indosiar)
 Lady Malino

References

External links 
 
  
 
 
 

CNN
Trans Media
24-hour television news channels in Indonesia
Television networks in Indonesia
Television channels and stations established in 2015
2015 establishments in Indonesia
Warner Bros. Discovery networks
Indonesian news websites